Mount Hancock is a mountain in Grafton County, New Hampshire, named after John Hancock (1737–1793), one of the Founding Fathers of the United States.

The mountain is on the south side of the Pemigewasset Wilderness, the source of the Pemigewasset River in the heart of the White Mountains, between Franconia Notch and Crawford Notch. Mount Hancock is flanked to the northeast by Mount Carrigain, to the south by Mount Huntington, and to the west by Mount Hitchcock. Prior to the completion of the Kancamagus Highway, Mount Hancock was one of the most remote, inaccessible peaks in the White Mountains.

See also

 List of mountains in New Hampshire
 Four-thousand footers
 White Mountain National Forest

References

External links
 
 "Hiking Mount Hancock". Appalachian Mountain Club.
 "Mt. Hancock (North Peak) Hiking Guide". FranklinSites.com
 "Mt. Hancock (South Peak) Hiking Guide". FranklinSites.com

Mountains of New Hampshire
White Mountains (New Hampshire)
Mountains of Grafton County, New Hampshire
New England Four-thousand footers